Jacobs River may refer to:

Waterways
 Jacobs River (New South Wales), a tributary of the Snowy River located in the Australian Alps
 Jacobs River (New Zealand), a river in the West Coast region of the South Island of New Zealand
 Jacobs River, an early name for the Aparima River in New Zealand

Communities
 Jacobs River, New Zealand, a locality in the West Coast region of the South Island of New Zealand

See also 
 Jacobs (disambiguation)